Gregory Steven Wojcik (January 7, 1946 – December 17, 2005) was a former American football player who played with the Los Angeles Rams and the San Diego Chargers of the National Football League. He also played for the Orange County Ramblers of the Continental Football League, for the Richmond Saints of the Atlantic Coast Football League, and for the Hawaiians of the World Football League. He played college football at USC.

College football career 
Wojcik first enrolled at Orange Coast College, a community college in Costa Mesa, California. He spent two years at Orange Coast before enrolling at the University of Southern California, where he played for the Trojans for one year in 1965. His college football career was cut short due to injury, as he missed the entire 1966 season.

Professional football career

Orange County Ramblers 
Wojcik, who went undrafted in the 1967 NFL Draft, joined the local Orange County Ramblers for their inaugural season in the Continental Football League, playing center. He remained with the team for their second and final season in 1968, playing defensive end that year.

New Orleans Saints 
On May 13, 1970, Wojcik signed with the New Orleans Saints. He was waived three months later on August 13, and joined the Saints' minor league affiliate, the Richmond Saints of the Atlantic Coast Football League. He played defensive tackle while with the Richmond Saints.

Los Angeles Rams 
On September 22, 1971, Wojcik signed with the Los Angeles Rams of the National Football League. He played in ten games with the Rams in 1971 and recorded half a sack.

San Diego Chargers (first stint) 
On January 29, 1972, the Rams traded Wojcik along with Deacon Jones and Lee White to the Chargers for Jeff Staggs, a 1972 second-round pick (30th overall–Jim Bertelsen) and 1973 second- and third-round picks (31st and 60th overall–Cullen Bryant and Tim Stokes respectively).

During the 1972 season, Wojcik played in seven games with two starts at left defensive tackle. He recorded two sacks.

In 1973, Wojcik was moved to right defensive tackle and played ten games at the position, recording another two sacks.

The Hawaiians 
On May 2, 1974, Wojcik signed with The Hawaiians of the World Football League. He played defensive end and defensive tackle with the team, which made it to the World Bowl semifinals.

Chicago Bears 
On July 10, 1975, Wojcik signed with the Chicago Bears.

St. Louis Cardinals 
On July 30, 1975, the Bears traded Wojcik to the St. Louis Cardinals in exchange for center Wes Miller. He was released on September 15.

San Diego Chargers (second stint) 
On October 29, 1975, Wojcik signed with the San Diego Chargers for a second time. He played six games with the team at defensive tackle in 1975 before his release on December 1, 1976.

References

1946 births
2005 deaths
American football centers
American football defensive ends
American football defensive tackles
Atlantic Coast Football League players
Chicago Bears players
Continental Football League players
Los Angeles Rams players
New Orleans Saints players
Players of American football from North Dakota
San Diego Chargers players
St. Louis Cardinals (football) players
The Hawaiians players
USC Trojans football players